KKPC (1230 AM) is a radio station licensed to Pueblo, Colorado. The station is owned by Mountain Radio Group, through licensee Colorado Radio Marketing, LLC.

KKPC signed on in February 1948 as KDZA, which from around 1962 until the mid-1980s was Pueblo's AM Top 40 outlet.

On September 23, 2021, KKPC changed their format from Colorado Public Radio news/talk to adult hits, branded as "101.9 The Lake".

Former Colorado Public Radio programming
CPR's Colorado News network broadcasts programming from National Public Radio (including Morning Edition and All Things Considered), American Public Media (including A Prairie Home Companion), and Public Radio International (including This American Life and The World), as well as an original daily interview show called Colorado Matters.

References

External links

KPC
Adult hits radio stations in the United States
Radio stations established in 1948
1948 establishments in Colorado